Badharlick (meaning Harlek's dwelling) is a hamlet in the parish of Egloskerry, Cornwall, situated halfway between the villages of Tregeare and Egloskerry.

References

External links

Hamlets in Cornwall